Myrmica pilinodis is a species of ant of the subfamily Myrmicinae. It is found in Sri Lanka.

References

Animaldiversity.org
Itis.org

External links

 at antwiki.org

Myrmica
Hymenoptera of Asia